Eupyra imperialis is a moth of the subfamily Arctiinae. It was described by Gottlieb August Wilhelm Herrich-Schäffer in 1853. It is found in Venezuela, Peru and Colombia.

Subspecies
Eupyra imperialis imperialis (Venezuela, Peru)
Eupyra imperialis ducalis Maassen, 1890 (Colombia)

References

 

Arctiinae
Moths described in 1853